Astomum is a genus of mosses belonging to the family Pottiaceae.

The genus has almost cosmopolitan distribution.

Species

Species:

Astomum austrocrispum 
Astomum borbonicum 
Astomum brisbanicum

References

Pottiaceae
Moss genera